Gorka is a rural locality (a village) in Staroselskoye Rural Settlement, Vologodsky District, Vologda Oblast, Russia. The population was 160 as of 2002.

Geography 
The distance to Vologda is 61 km, to Striznevo is 12 km. Yakovlevo, Isakovo, Dulovo are the nearest rural localities.

References 

Rural localities in Vologodsky District